Wu Jialiang (born June 23, 1985 in Harbin, Heilongjiang) is a Chinese former competitive figure skater. He is the 2008 & 2009 Chinese national champion.

Wu was born in Harbin, and lives in Beijing. He started skating in 1989. He is coached by Yu Lijie.

Competitive highlights

References

External links 

 

1985 births
Living people
Chinese male single skaters
Figure skaters at the 2007 Winter Universiade
Figure skaters from Harbin
Figure skaters at the 2007 Asian Winter Games
Figure skaters at the 2011 Asian Winter Games
Competitors at the 2009 Winter Universiade